The World's Ugliest Dog Contest is an annual contest held in Petaluma, California, as part of the Sonoma-Marin Fair, to decide which of the dogs entered in the contest is the ugliest. The contest, along with the rest of the fair, is typically scheduled for the fourth week of June. Along with the title of “The World’s Ugliest Dog” the winner’s owner receives a check for $1,000 and a trophy As of 2017, the prize has been increased to $1,600, a trophy and a free trip to New York City. There is significant media coverage, and as many as 20,000–30,000 people attend the contest during the fair each year. The fair now holds an all-day Dog Lovers' Festival preceding the evening contest.

The contest has been going on since the 1970s. In 2009 the Sonoma-Marin Fair trademarked the phrase World's Ugliest Dog. In 2013, the contest celebrated its 25th anniversary as a fair-produced event, and an anniversary book, World's Ugliest Dogs, was published with text by the contest's producer of seven years, Vicki DeArmon, and photos by photographers who have covered the contest over the years for the fair.

History

The World’s Ugliest Dog Contest began in the 1970s as a way to generate revenue for the Old Adobe Association in Petaluma, and member Ross Smith is widely credited as the creator of the contest. After the association considered replacing their pet parade with a dog contest, Smith suggested an ugly dog contest, and the idea stuck. The Old Adobe Association nurtured the World’s Ugliest Dog Contest in its infancy, with Smith emceeing until 1981. Winners for the contest have been recorded since 1976, and it became a part of the Sonoma-Marin Fair in 1988. Animal Planet began sponsoring and filming the competition in 2006, bringing additional attention to the event.

Participation
Dogs generally come from across the United States but are welcome to enter from around the world. In contrast to conformation shows (which are restricted to purebreds), the World's Ugliest Dog Contest has separate divisions for pedigreed dogs and mutts, with the two winners then competing for the overall prize, and contestants are not judged against any breed specification.

Dog owners must provide documentation of veterinarian checks to determine the competing animal is healthy. The Sonoma-Marin Fair has also partnered with animal rights groups such as the Sonoma County Humane Society to educate the public about animals and to provide opportunities to adopt rescue dogs. The fair issues a photo of the winner, a press release summing up the contest, and YouTube video within hours of the contest conclusion. Contestants for each new year are featured on the website before the contest as well in the World's Ugliest Dog Voting.

Winners
Contest winners are recorded since 1976, and include Boomer, a French mastiff, in 1996.

1999–2001
Nana, the contest winner for three years between 1996 and 2001 and a previous winner of the mutt division, was a three-pound chihuahua mix with a sidelong walk. She appeared on the cover of a RatDog album and twice on The Tonight Show. She died in 2001.

2002
Rascal, a 7 lb. Chinese Crested owned by actor Dane Andrew of Sunnyvale, California, won the coveted title in 2002 and is now in “The Ring of Champions”. Rascal has gone on to set history winning the 2008 Oldest Ugly Dog Contest in Fort Bragg, the Tim Downs Ugly Dog Contest in 2008, the 2009 Ugly Dog Contest first place in Highland, and the 2009 Regal Cinemas "Hotel For Dogs" Ugly Dog Contest in Florida. As of June 2010, he has won ten Ugly Dog contests. Rascal was so ugly that Jay Leno put him on The Tonight Show before he had ever even won, and now he has been cast in four horror movies, seen on The View, Last Call with Carson Daly, and The Insider. He was featured in People magazine, Hello, Star, and has his own leash line, cartoon strip, and documentary, the proceeds of which go to animal charities.

Rascal is a direct descendant of Chi Chi, who won more World's Ugliest Dog titles than any other dog in history, putting him in the Guinness Book of World Records with 8 wins.

2003–2005
Sam, a blind Chinese Crested dog from Santa Barbara, California, was voted the world's ugliest dog three times in a row, from 2003 through 2005. He died in November 2005, bringing an end to his three-year reign.

2006
Scandal erupted during the 2006 World's Ugliest Dog Contest when an as yet unidentified person gained unauthorized electronic access to the contest's internet voting page and deleted 40,000 votes from then leader "Pee Wee", son of "Sam", and 30,000 votes from second-place "Victoria", according to marketing director Vicki DeArmon. To rectify the situation, fair officials decided to completely restart internet voting on May 22, 2006. The official winner, Archie, was selected by a panel of judges on June 23, 2006.
Archie died July 2008.

2007
The winner of the 2007 World's Ugliest Dog competition was a Chinese Crested-chihuahua mixed-breed dog named Elwood, who had placed second the previous year. Rascal, who won the 2002 title, became the Ugliest Dog on the West Coast. With the loss of Archie and Elwood, Rascal is the only dog alive to be "Ring of Champions" World's Ugliest Dog. Most of the competitors in the competition were also Chinese Crested, because the breed can exhibit exaggerated traits like a mohawk, bug eyes, and a long, wagging tongue. Elwood died at the age of 8 on November 28, 2013.

2008
The 2008 World's Ugliest Dog competition was won by a Chinese Crested dog named Gus. Eleven dogs took part in the competition.

Rascal, the 2002 World's Ugliest Dog and Ring of Champions holder, won the World's Oldest Ugly Dog Contest in Fort Bragg, California on August 30, 2008, making him the only dog to win both top titles.

On November 10, 2008, Gus died. He was 9 years old. Runner up Rascal, The 2002 World's Ugliest Dog, frepresented the Contest and Fair officially as the World's Ugliest Dog in the Petaluma Butter and Eggs parade.

2009
Pabst, a boxer mix owned by Miles Egstad of Citrus Heights, California, won the 2009 World's Ugliest Dog competition; Miss Ellie, a blind 16-year-old Chinese Crested Hairless, won in the pedigree category; Pabst beat her in a run-off for the overall title.

Miss Ellie died June 1, 2010, at the age of 17.

2010

Princess Abby, a chihuahua with "a hunched and peculiar walk due to that her back legs are longer than her front (which allows her to have moments of bipedalism), a missing eye, and mismatched ears", won the 2010 contest out of a field of 25 dogs. Despite being a rescue dog, she was entered in the pedigree division.

2011
Yoda, a previously abandoned 14-year-old Chinese Crested-Chihuahua mix with a malformed nose, "short tufts of hair, protruding tongue, and long, seemingly hairless legs", won the 2011 contest. The dog is from Hanford, California, and is owned by dog groomer Terry Schumacher.

Yoda died in her sleep at her home in Hanford, California on March 10, 2012. She was 15.

2012
The 2012 winner is Mugly, an 8-year-old Chinese Crested with a short snout, beady eyes, and several unkempt white whiskers, owned by Bev Nicholson of Peterborough, England. Mugly was the first dog from outside the United States to win.

2013
In 2013 Walle, a four-year-old "huge-headed, duck-footed mix of beagle, boxer and basset hound" from Chico, California beat 29 other contenders to win the contest. The dog's owner, Tammie Barbee, entered the dog into the contest at the last minute.

2014
The 2014 contest was won by Peanut (alternately named Opossum), a 2-year-old mutt believed to be a mix of Chihuahua and Shih Tzu. Peanut is owned by Holly Chandler of Greenville, North Carolina. In contrast to most of the contestants, Peanut's physical deformities, which include deformed lips and eyelids (which give the dog the appearance of a perpetual growl) and significant loss of hair, were a result of being abused as a puppy; Chandler rescued the dog from an animal hospital.

2015
Quasi Modo, a 10-year-old mutt with Dutch Shepherd and pit bull lineage, won the 2015 contest, narrowly beating two Chinese Crested/Chihuahua mixes. Quasi Modo was noted for its shortened frame, hunched back and long legs relative to its body, leading to confusion at first glance as to whether it was a dog or a hyena, according to the dog's biography. The dog's unnamed owner is from Loxahatchee, Florida and rescued the dog from a shelter.

2016
The winner of the 2016 contest was SweePee Rambo, a Chinese Crested from Van Nuys, California.

2017
Martha, a 3-year-old Neapolitan Mastiff owned by Shirley Dawn Zindler of Sebastopol, California, won the 2017 contest. Weighing in at 125 pounds and having extremely loose and droopy jowls, the once-blind rescue dog was particularly noted for her uncooperative personality, being described as a "snoring, gassy" dog that refused to show off for the crowd, bosses around other dogs in her company, slobbers all over human guests, and knocks over water buckets.

2018 
The 2018 contest was won by Zsa Zsa, an English bulldog with a particularly wide-legged stance, underbite, & very long droopy tongue.

2018 was the first year to award the People's Choice Award, based solely on the online voting results. The winner was Himisaboo, a 12-year-old Chinese Crested Dachshund mix from Oregon. Himisaboo is a press favorite each year and is known as the Trump Dog because of his natural strawberry blonde combover.

2019
Scamp the Tramp, a mutt with unkempt hair that grows into dreadlocks and stubby legs and who was rescued from the streets in Compton, California, won the 2019 contest; his owner, Yvonne Morones, also owned Nana when she won the contest.

The People's Choice award went to Meatloaf, a bulldog with protruding teeth from Sacramento, California.

2020–2021
Due to the COVID-19 pandemic, the 2020 and 2021 competitions were cancelled.

2022
Mr. Happy Face, a hairless Chinese crested-Chihuahua mix, who was adopted from a shelter in Arizona after being rescued from a hoarder's house, won the 2022 competition.

Television and film
Animal Planet has sponsored the event and broadcast the show on television for several years. In the 2009 contest, the event included celebrity judges such as Jon Provost ("Timmy" on the 1950s television show Lassie) as well as an Ugly is the New Beautiful Fashion Show featuring models and adoptable rescue dogs. Hosts rotate each year. In 2013, syndicated radio hosts Bob & Sheri hosted the show.

In 2011, the contest was the subject of an hour-long indie documentary entitled Worst in Show, produced by Don Lewis and John Beck.

See also
 List of individual dogs

References

External links
Sonoma-Marin Fairgrounds - World's Ugliest Dog Contest Official Page

Dogs in popular culture
Tourist attractions in Sonoma County, California
Dog shows and showing
Culture in the San Francisco Bay Area
Petaluma, California